Edward Pierson Ramsay FRSEFLS LLD (3 December 1842 – 16 December 1916) was an Australian zoologist who specialised in ornithology.

Early life
Ramsay was born in Dobroyd Estate, Long Cove, Sydney, and educated at St Mark's Collegiate School, The King's School, Parramatta. He studied medicine from 1863 to 1865 at the University of Sydney but did not graduate.

Career
Although he never had had any formal scientific training in zoology, Ramsay had a keen interest in natural history and published many papers. In 1863 he was treasurer of the Entomological Society of New South Wales, he contributed a paper on the "Oology of Australia" to the Philosophical Society in July 1865, and when this society was merged into the Royal Society of New South Wales, he was made a life member in recognition of the work he had done for the Philosophical Society.

In 1868 Ramsay joined with his brothers in a sugar-growing plantation in Queensland which, however, was not successful. Ramsay was one of the foundation members of the Linnean Society of New South Wales when it was formed in 1874, and a member of its council from the beginning until 1892. He became the first Australian-born Curator of the Australian Museum and built up a large variety of native weapons, dresses, utensils and ornaments illustrating the ethnology of Polynesia and Australia. From 1876 until 1894, when he had to resign due to his declining health, he published a Catalogue of the Australian Birds in the Australian Museum at Sydney in four parts.

In 1883 Ramsay traveled to London to attend the International Fisheries Exhibition. At that time he met Military Surgeon Francis Day who had collected fishes over several decades in India, Burma, Malaysia and other areas in southern Asia. Ramsay negotiated  purchase a portion of Day's collection, including about 150 of Day's type specimens.

Presumably during the same trip to Britain he visited Edinburgh, as he was elected an Ordinary Fellow of the Royal Society of Edinburgh (requiring his physical presence) in April 1884. His proposers were Sir John Murray, Sir William Turner, James Geikie and William Carmichael McIntosh.

Late life
After his resignation as Curator, Ramsay served the Australian Museum as "consulting ornithologist" until 1909. He died on 16 December because of carcinoma.

Taxa described by him
Among organisms Ramsay described are:
northern death adder (Acanthophis praelongus) 
the pig-nosed turtle (Carettochelys insculpta) 
the giant bandicoot (Peroryctes broadbenti)
the grey-headed robin (Heteromyias cinereifrons)
The freshwater anchovy (Thryssa scratchleyi)
Papuan king parrot (Alisterus chloropterus)

See :Category:Taxa named by Edward Pierson Ramsay.

Taxon named in his honor 
Ramsay is commemorated in the scientific names of two species of Australian snakes, Aspidites ramsayi and Austrelaps ramsayi.

The Spotted grubfish Parapercis ramsayi is believed to be named after him.

References

External links

Australian Museum Ramsay page

1842 births
1916 deaths
Australian ornithologists
People educated at The King's School, Parramatta